Giorgio Massari (13 October 1687 – 20 December 1766) was an Italian late-Baroque  architect from Venice.

He designed the Villa Lattes near Treviso in 1715, the church of Santo Spritito in Udine, the church of Santa Maria della Pace 1720–46 in Brescia. In Venice, he often worked closely with Tiepolo in planning interior decoration of palaces.  
Among his masterpieces are the Chiesa dei Gesuati (1726–43) located in Dorsoduro, Venice and the Palazzo Grassi-Stucky (1749). In the latter, Massari executed a traditional elegant marble-fronted Grand Canal palace facade, with Baroque rhythms and variations to the arrangement of bays, disrupting the classical simplicity. Massari also designed the scenographic staircase entry to Villa Giovanelli, Noventa Padovana.

Massari finished some works by Longhena, for example, the heavily decorated Ca' Rezzonico, also found on the Grand Canal. Some of Massari's design were completed by his pupil Bernardino Maccarucci.

Gallery

References

1687 births
1766 deaths
Republic of Venice architects
Italian Baroque architects